The Taipei Prison, Agency of Corrections, Ministry of Justice (Nickname: 北監/北监 Běijiān) is a prison located in Guishan District, Taoyuan City, Taiwan, under the jurisdiction of the Ministry of Justice.

It can hold up to 2,705 prisoners. It houses criminals who have committed serious crimes and repeat criminals from northern Taiwan who are sentenced to at least ten years in prison. Taipei Prison houses foreign prisoners. Three branch prisons of Taipei Prison, Taipei Detention Center, Shilin Detention Center, and Sindian Detention Center, hold prisoners with sentences of less than five years each.

History

It was a remodeled facility built under the Qing Dynasty. It was rebuilt in an area southeast of Taihoku City (modern-day Taipei) in 1902; this is the current Ai Guo East Road. Allied POW's were held here during the war; on 19 June 1945 fourteen US Army and Navy airmen were executed at Taihoku Prison in the early morning. They were found guilty of "indiscriminate bombing" of civilians of Taiwan. Their remains were cremated and their ashes placed a local shrine. The prison received its current name, Taiwan Taipei Prison, in October 1945, as the Republic of China took control of Taiwan from Imperial Japan. As time passed, the prison became overcrowded as Taiwan was at war. The Ministry of Judicial Administration sold the previous site and bought  of land in Guishan so a new facility could begin construction at the end of 1958. On October 11, 1961 the groundbreaking occurred and was completed at the end of December 1962. On January 11, 1963, on Judicial Day, the prison opened in Guishan.

Notable prisoners
Former President Chen Shui-bian was incarcerated for a 19-year sentence at the Taipei Prison as Inmate 1020.

See also

 Remains of Taipei prison walls

References

1895 establishments in Taiwan
Buildings and structures in Taoyuan City
Prisons in Taiwan